Samuel James William Smith (14 November 1904 – June 1988) was an English footballer who played at inside-forward for Cradley Heath, Cardiff City, Port Vale, Hull City, and Millwall.

Career
Smith played for Darby End Victoria and Cradley Heath, before playing four First Division games for Cardiff City in the 1926–27 season. He then left Ninian Park and dropped down to the Second Division to sign with Port Vale in May 1927. He played just four games at The Old Recreation Ground in the later half of the 1927–28 season, before being given a free transfer in May 1928. He moved on to Hull City and Millwall.

Career statistics
Source:

References

1904 births
1988 deaths
Sportspeople from Stafford
English footballers
Association football forwards
Cradley Heath F.C. players
Cardiff City F.C. players
Port Vale F.C. players
Hull City A.F.C. players
Millwall F.C. players
English Football League players